Paopi 2 - Coptic Calendar - Paopi 4

The third day of the Coptic month of Paopi, the second month of the Coptic year. On a common year, this day corresponds to September 30, of the Julian Calendar, and October 13, of the Gregorian Calendar. This day falls in the Coptic season of Akhet, the season of inundation.

Commemorations

Saints 

 The martyrdom of Saint Ursus and Saint Victor of the Theban Legion  
 The martyrdom of Saint John of Ashrub, the Soldier 
 The departure of Pope Simeon II, the fifty-first Patriarch of the See of Saint Mark 
 The departure of Saint Theodora, the Empress

References 

Days of the Coptic calendar